Sonny Mallhi (born May 5, 1972, in Chicago, Illinois) is an American film producer, writer, and director. His directorial debut film Anguish was released in 2015. His next two films, Family Blood and Hurt (both produced by Blumhouse Productions) was released in 2018.

Filmography

References

External links
 

1972 births
American film directors
Writers from Chicago
Film producers from Illinois
Screenwriters from Illinois
Living people
Horror film directors